Sheryl Munks (born 1965) is an Australian actress, best known for her role in television serials and made for television films. A former dancer of classical ballet, jazz ballet and tap, as well as a dance instructor. She is perhaps best known to audiences for her role as inmate Michelle "Brumby" Tucker in the television series Prisoner in 1986.

TV credits
Subsequent TV credits include: The Flying Doctors, Acropolis Now, Blue Heelers, "Neighbours", A Country Practice, Stingers and The Man from Snowy River

Filmography

External links
 

Australian film actresses
Australian soap opera actresses
Living people
1965 births
20th-century Australian actresses
21st-century Australian actresses